44 or Tales of the Night (French: 44 ou les récits de la nuit, Arabic: 44 aw Oustourat al layl) is a French-Moroccan film directed by Moroccan filmmaker Moumen Smihi in 1981 and released in 1985.

Synopsis 
The film chronicles the tale of two Moroccan families, one from Fez, the other from Chaouen, from 1912 to 1956, the duration of the European protectorate over Morocco.

Cast 

 Pierre Clémenti
 Abdelslam Faraoui
 Marie-France Pisier
 Christine Pascal
 Khady Thiam
 Mohamed El Habachi
 Naima Lamcharki

References 

1985 films
French drama films
Moroccan drama films
1980s French films